Menegazzia inflata is a species of foliose lichen found in New Zealand. Originally described as a species of Parmelia in 1940, it was transferred to the genus Menegazzia in 1983.

See also
List of Menegazzia species

References

inflata
Lichen species
Lichens described in 1983
Lichens of New Zealand
Taxa named by Johannes Hillmann